Pedro Acerden is a Filipino zarzuela playwright who writes in the Waray language.

References
 Clarita C. Filipinas. Lineyte-Samarnon zarzuela (1899-1977): history & aesthetics. Tacloban City, Philippines: Divine Word University Publications, 1991. Cited in Victor N. Sugbo, "Language policy and local literature in the Philippines."

Visayan writers
Waray-language writers
Filipino writers
Year of birth missing (living people)
Living people
Place of birth missing (living people)